James or Jimmy Milne may refer to:

James Milne (cricketer) (born 1961), New Zealand cricketer
James Milne (railway manager) (1883–1958), GWR General Manager
James Milne (sport shooter) (died 1958), British sports shooter
James Milne, solo artist and bassist for Okkervil River, known as Lawrence Arabia
James Milne, bassist for Cornershop
James Milne (mathematician) (born 1942), New Zealand mathematician
James M. Milne (1850–1903), principal of the State University of New York at Oneonta
James F. Milne (born 1950), Vermont business and political figure
James Robert Milne (died 1961), Scottish physicist
Jimmy Milne (footballer, born 1911) (1911–1997), Scottish football player and manager
Jimmy Milne (Australian footballer) (1898–1961), Australian footballer for St Kilda
Jimmy Milne (trade unionist) (1921–1986), STUC General Secretary